99 Seven (callsign 4RED) is a radio station serving Brisbane's Greater North and the Moreton Bay Region. 99 Seven broadcast from purpose-built studios in Anzac Avenue in the Suburb of Redcliffe to Brisbane's greater North and Moreton Bay. The transmitter site is located at the Water Tower in the suburb of Margate, Queensland. 99 Seven was the first radio station with a community broadcasting licence in Australia to have a full digital air chain. This occurred in 2006/2007 when the station installed Klotz Broadcasting equipment and Omnia processing. Currently 99 Seven broadcast using Rode microphones, Klotz Aeon and Xenon consoles, Simian automation and when required Denon DNC635 CD players. Main audio processing is with Omnia equipment and back up processing is with CRL FM Amigo. Online streaming uses Omnia processing.

See also
 List of radio stations in Australia

References

Radio stations in Brisbane
Community radio stations in Australia
Radio stations established in 1992